Mena B. Lafkioui is a linguist specializing in Berber languages. She is currently Research Director at the French National Centre for Scientific Research and Professor (Director of Studies) of Berber Linguistics at the School for Advanced Studies in the Social Sciences.

Biography
Lafkioui took her PhD at the National Institute for Oriental Languages and Civilizations (INALCO) in Paris, France, between 1995 and 1998. She subsequently worked there as a postdoctoral researcher, as well as at Ghent University in Belgium (1999-2000) and Leiden University in the Netherlands (2001-2004). In 2005 she took up a research professorship at the University of Calabria in Italy, before being appointed senior research professor at the University of Milano-Bicocca in 2008. She left this position in 2014 for her current position as Director of Research at the French National Centre for Scientific Research (CNRS) in Paris. In 2018 she was also appointed Director of Studies at the School for Advanced Studies in the Social Sciences (EHESS). She has been an ordinary member of the Academia Europaea since 2013.

Research
Lafkioui has published widely on the linguistics of the Berber languages and Arabic, writing mainly in English and French. Her areas of interest include negation, information structure, sociolinguistics and dialectology. Her magnum opus and most-cited work is her linguistic atlas of Berber varieties of the Rif: this has been described as "the most extensive atlas of dialect variation in Berber ever published" and "an essential reference for anyone interested in linguistic variation within Berber or across North Africa as a whole".

Selected publications
 Lafkioui, Mena B. 1996. La négation en tarifit (Negation in Tarifit). In Salem Chaker and Dominique Caubet (eds.), La négation en berbère et en arabe maghrébin (Negation in Berber and Maghrebi Arabic), 49–77. Paris: L'Harmattan. 
 Lafkioui, Mena B. 2007. Atlas linguistique des variétés berbères du Rif (Linguistic atlas of Berber varieties of the Rif). Cologne: Rüdiger Köppe. 
 Lafkioui, Mena B. 2013. Reinventing negation patterns in Moroccan Arabic. In Mena B. Lafkioui (ed.), African Arabic: Approaches to Dialectology, 51–94. Berlin: Mouton de Gruyter.
 Lafkioui, Mena B. 2013. Multilingualism, multimodality and identity construction on French-Based Amazigh (Berber) websites. Revue francaise de linguistique appliquee (French Review of Applied Linguistics) 18(2), 135–151.

References

External links

Women linguists
Living people
Members of Academia Europaea
Year of birth missing (living people)
INALCO alumni
Academic staff of the University of Calabria
Academic staff of the University of Milano-Bicocca